Pietro Menegatti (born 17 January 1992) is an Italian footballer who plays as a goalkeeper.

Club career
Menegatti made his debut in the Lega Pro Seconda Divisione for Poggibonsi on 1 December 2012 in a game against Salernitana. His first game in the unified Serie C for SPAL took place on 1 September 2014 against Pontedera. In December 2018 he joined Serie D club Montegiorgio.

On 16 July 2019, he returned to Monopoli on a 2-year contract.

Personal life
Menegatti is the younger brother of beach volleyball player Marta Menegatti.

References

External links
 

1992 births
People from Rovigo
Footballers from Veneto
Living people
Italian footballers
Association football goalkeepers
Ravenna F.C. players
Venezia F.C. players
U.S. Poggibonsi players
S.P.A.L. players
A.C. Cesena players
Alma Juventus Fano 1906 players
S.S. Monopoli 1966 players
Serie C players
Serie D players
Sportspeople from the Province of Rovigo